Unalaska is a volcanic island in the Fox Islands group of the Aleutian Islands in the US state of Alaska located at . The city of Unalaska, Alaska, covers part of the island and all of neighboring Amaknak Island where the Port of Dutch Harbor is located. The population of the island excluding Amaknak as of the 2000 census was 1,759 residents.

Unalaska is the second-largest island in the Fox Islands group and the Aleutian Islands. The coastline of Unalaska is markedly different in appearance than other major Aleutian Islands, with numerous inlets and peninsulas. The irregular coastline is broken by three long deep bays, Beaver Inlet, Unalaska Bay, and Makushin Bay, as well as by numerous smaller bays and coves. Unalaska's terrain is rugged and covered with mountains, and during the greater part of the year, the higher elevations are covered with snow. The highest point on Unalaska is the active volcano Mount Makushin.

Unalaska is the Aleut name for the island. Several theories about its origin exist; the most likely is that the name derives from the Russian word Ounalashka, an adaptation of the Aleut word for near the mainland, nawan Alaskax.

History

Native Unalaskans, called Unangan or Aleuts, to non-Unangan, have lived on the island for at least 10,000 years. The island was first seen by westerners in 1741 by Vitus Bering. By 1759, at least 3,000 Aleuts lived on Unalaska island. A Russian settlement was constructed in 1759, but four years later it was destroyed by the Aleuts, together with four merchant ships. The attacks claimed the lives of 162 Russian settlers. The survivors managed to hold their own until 1764, when they were rescued by the Russians. This event triggered bloody reprisals against the natives which took the lives of about 5,000 Aleuts. By 1787, many Aleut seal hunters were enslaved by the Russian American Company and forced to harvest seal fur. By 1840, only 200 to 400 Aleuts still lived on the island.

The 1788 expedition of Esteban José Martínez and Gonzalo López de Haro explored the coast of Alaska as far as Unalaska Island, marking the farthest west the Spanish ever explored in the region.

Also in 1778, English explorer James Cook visited the island, and spelled it Oonalashka in his journal.

In Moscow on May 31, 1988, President Ronald Reagan mentioned the meeting of Americans and Russians on this island in the 19th century as an example of early US-Russian friendship.

On December 8, 2004, the Malaysian cargo ship Selendang Ayu ran aground off Unalaska Island, causing a large oil spill.

Unalaska provides the backdrop for Cindy Dyson's novel And She Was, recalling much of its rich Aleutian history.

References

External links

  Community of Unalaska
  Unalaska information
 Unalaska Island: Blocks 1016 thru 1018, Census Tract 1 and Blocks 2002 thru 2028, Block 2031, Census Tract 2, Aleutians West Census Area, Alaska United States Census Bureau
  Unalaska Community Broadcasting
 Xpda.com: photos of Unalaska Island

 
Fox Islands (Alaska)
Islands of Aleutians West Census Area, Alaska
Islands of Alaska
Islands of Unorganized Borough, Alaska